Ceki Benşuşe (born July 19, 1980) is the guitar player of the Turkish band Sefarad. He was born in Istanbul and graduated in 1999 from the Jewish school in Istanbul, Ulus Özel Musevi Lisesi.

Discography 
Sefarad
Sefarad II
Evvel Zaman

See also 
Turkish pop music
Music of Turkey
List of Turkish pop music performers

External links 
  Official site

1980 births
Living people
Musicians from Istanbul
Jewish musicians
Turkish Jews